Robin David Paul Huggins (born 18 April 1947) is a former English cricketer.  Huggins was a right-handed batsman.  He was born in Coltishall, Norfolk.

Huggins made his debut for Norfolk in the 1965 Minor Counties Championship against Lincolnshire.  Huggins played Minor counties cricket for Norfolk from 1965 to 1989, which included 156 Minor Counties Championship matches and 17 MCCA Knockout Trophy matches.  He made his List A debut against Leicestershire in the 1982 NatWest Trophy.  He made 3 further List A appearances, the last coming against Leicestershire in the 1985 NatWest Trophy.  In his 4 List A matches, he scored 91 runs at an average of 22.75, with a high score of 29.

References

External links
Robin Huggins at ESPNcricinfo
Robin Huggins at CricketArchive

1947 births
Living people
People from Coltishall
English cricketers
Norfolk cricketers
Sportspeople from Norfolk